Thakka Thakka is a 2015 Indian Tamil-language action drama film written and directed by Sanjeev, whose younger brother, Vikranth, plays the lead role. The film, earlier titled Piravi, also stars Rahul Venkat, Abhinaya, Leema Babu and Parvati Nirban. It was released by S. Thanu's Kalaipuli International on 28 August 2015. The film was dubbed into Hindi as Phir Se Mafiaraaj.

Cast

Vikranth as Sathya
Abhinaya as Indhu
Aravinnd Singh as Karthi
Parvati Nirban as Saranya
Aruldoss as Bala
Rahul Venkat as Paraman
Charle as Indhu's father
Uma as Sarasu, Indhu's mother
Bose Venkat as Kasi
Leema Babu as Thulasi
Thavasi as Annachi
Master Shashikiran as Young Sathya
Master Darshan as Young Karthi
Anjana
Ranjini
Sarithiran
Neil
Kalaikumar
Yogi Ram as Kumaru
Arya, Vishal and Vishnu Vishal appeared in a promotional song.

Soundtrack
The soundtrack was composed by debutant Jakes Bejoy. The album was released by the Saragama label.
"Thakka Thakka" - Haricharan
"Saaral Mazhai" - Saindhavi, Abhay
"Yaar Ivano" - Sanjeevkumar, Jakes Bijoy
"Thedi Thedi" - Jakes Bejoy, Ranjith
"Yaaro Yaar" - Pradeep
"Egambaney" - Ayyadurai
"Edhum Sollamal" - Chinmayi, Haricharan

Critical reception
The Times of India rated the film 3 out of 5 and wrote, "Thakka Thakka is the kind of film that shows spirit even though it doesn't come together as a whole. There are moments that stand out, but the film lacks the tautness in writing that could have made it into a gripping action film". Sudhir Srinivasan of The Hindu wrote, "Thakka Thakka's predictable, wafer-thin plot actually makes even seem like meritorious literary work in comparison." Behindwoods rated the film 2 out of 5 and wrote, "On the whole what promises to be a thrilling action film loses track mid-way." Silverscreen wrote, "Everything about Thaakka Thaaka, from the title, to the posters, to the trailers and promos, made it a point to tell the audience that the film is about action. The filmmakers wanted the film to be 'hard-hitting'. Perhaps they took the term too seriously, because most of the film is full of 'hard-hitting' stunts – punches, throat-slitting, stabbing, and hitting people with long iron rods."

References

External links
 

2015 films
2010s Tamil-language films
2015 action drama films
Indian action drama films
Films scored by Jakes Bejoy
2015 directorial debut films
2015 action films